K. Murugavel is an Indian politician. He currently serves as a Member of the Legislative Assembly of Tamil Nadu.

K. Murugavel was elected to the Tamil Nadu legislative assembly as a Dravida Munnetra Kazhagam candidate from Mudukulathur constituency in  2006 election. It is reported that there was development in his constituency during the period between 2006 and 2011.

References 

Dravida Munnetra Kazhagam politicians
Living people
Year of birth missing (living people)